Small Time Giants is an alternative rock band from Greenland.  Besides Greenland, the band is popular in Denmark where it has developed great following with their mainly English-language songs. Their EP Six Shades of Heart was released in February 2012 and their debut studio album Stethoscope was released on DIGIDI, the digital distribution network in October 2014. In 2015, the band won the contest for the official song of the Arctic Winter Games, which was held in Nuuk, Greenland in 2016. The song, entitled "We Are the Arctic", was formally released in October 2015.

The band released the Christmas-themed single "Angerlarlanga" on December 12, 2016. The song reached No. 1 on the Danish iTunes chart that month.

Members
The band is made up of young musicians from Qaqortoq in South Greenland. But the band's newest member, drummer Jonas Nilsson, is from North Jutland. The members are:

Miki Jensen - lead vocals
Pilutannguaq Hammeken - keyboards, guitar
Jakob Skovaa - bass
Jonas Lundsgaard Nilsson - drums

Discography

Albums

EPs
2012: Six Shades of Heart

Album
2014: Stethoscope
2020: Formed by Mistakes

References

External links

Facebook

Greenlandic musical groups
Greenlandic rock music groups
Alternative rock groups